Sungri Motor Plant is a 600,000 m2 vehicle factory in the city of Tokchon (덕천), North Korea. It was the most capable plant of the North Korean automotive industry before being surpassed by Pyeonghwa Motors. The plant produces urban and off-road passenger cars, small, medium, and heavy cargo, as well as haulage construction and off-road trucks and buses.

All models are reported to be replicas or derivations of foreign cars. Vehicles are generally for civilian and commercial use, as government officials favour foreign imports and the armed forces have their own facilities.

On November 20, 2017, Kim Jong-un was reported to have visited and provided on-the-spot guidance at the Sungri Motor Plant.

History

The Sungri Motor Plant was founded in November 1950 as the Tokchon Motor Plant (덕천자동차공장). It produced its first vehicle, a Sungri-58 truck, in 1958. In 1975, the plant was renamed Sungri Motor Plant (sungri meaning victory in Korean). In 1980, annual production was reported by the government to be 20,000 units per year, however the rate was more likely between 6,000 and 7,000 units per year. In 1996 production was crippled due to the country's economic difficulties, with approximately 150 units produced.

Car models
 Achimkoy (아침의 꽃 - 'Flower of the morning') - 5 seat sedan, a copy of the GAZ-M20 Pobeda. Most likely a single prototype.
 Kunchook (건축 - 'Construction')
 Jaju (자주 - 'Independence' or 'Frequent') - A five-seat passenger car. Clone of the Volkswagen Passat.
 Kaengsaeng (갱생 - 'Rebirth') - A more modified Sungri-4.10 (a Korean GAZ 69 and Jeep combination) of 1968, then moved for production on Pyongsang Auto Works.
 Paektusan (백두산 - 'Mount Paekdu'), Pyongyang 4.10 and Kaengsaeng 88  - Unauthorized clones of the Mercedes-Benz W201 luxury passenger car.
 Shintaibaik (신태백 - 'New Taebaek')
 Sungri-4.10 - Korean GAZ 69 four-wheel drive car modified with new front end.
 Sungri-4.25 - Pick-up version of Korean GAZ 69.

Truck models

 Kumsusan, Kyomsusang (금수산 - 'Mount Kumsu') - A 40-ton construction truck-dumper of 1979. 
 Sonyon - Small urban delivery truck of the 1990s.
 Sungri-58 (승리 58호 - 'Victory 58') - A clone of the Soviet  GAZ-51 (ГАЗ-51) Truck, however with weaker springs. The Sungri-58 also suffers from unusually high fuel consumption due to its crudely copied GAZ-51 carburetor which has been used since 1961. It was first built in 1958. Later Sungri-58KA and Sungri-58NA (4x4) modifications with new cabin are appeared in the 1970s.
 Sungri-60/10.10) - A large 6x6 truck of 1960, it has a ten-ton payload and was used primarily for military purposes. It was featured on a North Korean stamp from 1961.
 Sungri-61 - Based on the GAZ-63 (ГАЗ-63) truck. It is a 4x4 version of Sungri-58. The Sungri-61 was first built in 1961. Later Sungri-61NA increased payload to 2 tons and a new cabin.
 Sungri/Jaju-64 - Based on the KrAZ 256. A 6x4 dump truck, it has a 10-ton payload and 15-litre V8-cylinder diesel engine. It was featured on a North Korean stamp from 1965. Built from 1964 to 1982.
 Sungri/Jaju-82 - A 4x2 multi-purpose truck of 1982, it has a 10-ton payload and a 15-litre V8-cylinder diesel engine. It was featured in a North Korean stamp from 1988. Sometimes referred to as "Chaju".
 Sungrisan/Konsor-25 ('Mount Victory'/'Construction') - A 25-ton dumper of 1970. It is based on the BelAZ trucks. Later built by the March 30th Works.

See also

 Automotive industry in North Korea
 Economy of North Korea

References

Motor vehicle manufacturers of North Korea
Vehicle manufacturing companies established in 1950
Tokchon